A Nice Pair is a compilation album by Pink Floyd, re-issuing their first two albums—The Piper at the Gates of Dawn and A Saucerful of Secrets—in a new gatefold sleeve. The album was released in December 1973 by Harvest and Capitol in the United States and the following month in the United Kingdom by Harvest and EMI. It reached number 36 in the US Billboard album charts, and was certified gold by the Recording Industry Association of America (RIAA) in March 1994.

Release history and track variations
There are a few differences between the US and UK issues on the first disc of this compilation. In the US Harvest Records and its distributor Capitol Records reconstructed their edition from tapes that had been previously altered for the debut 1967 US album Pink Floyd (the original U.S. title for Piper) and other recordings, which were cut from the UK version. As explained in a note on the back cover of the US edition of A Nice Pair, songs dropped from the US 1967 Pink Floyd album, "Flaming", "Astronomy Domine" and "Bike", are restored for this re-issue.

However, some of the restored songs appear in versions that are different from the UK Piper release: the eight-minute live Ummagumma recording of "Astronomy Domine" replaces the original four-minute studio recording; "Interstellar Overdrive" fades out slightly early (as it did on the US debut album) and adds a few seconds of silence before "The Gnome", rather than using a segue between these songs as found on the UK version; and "Flaming" is an alternate mix and edit which previously appeared on a US single, and the only track to appear on this album in mono. In later pressings, the correct stereo version of "Flaming" was restored, while the other songs continued to appear in the versions described here.  The US version of this album was also released in Canada.

Cover art
The cover is by Hipgnosis, who designed many other Pink Floyd covers, and consists of four grids of nine small images, including some proposed but previously unused album cover designs. Several images depict a well-known phrase or saying in the form of a visual pun; for instance, the centre right-hand panel on the front depicts "a fork in the road", while the bottom right represents "a fine kettle of fish". Another picture presents two puns on the album title: a nice pear, and an image of a woman's pair of breasts; the latter is censored with a black bar on some copies, while other US copies opted to cover it with a purple and white sticker over the shrink wrap. Initial copies had a picture of a Mr. W.R. Phang's dental surgery on the cover (a genuine business photographed in Hammersmith, west London), but Dr. Phang objected because NHS dentists were not permitted to advertise, and the picture was replaced with one of a gargling monk. US editions from the 1980s restored both the nudity and the W.R. Phang photo.  The selection of band photos on the inside cover also varies, with some copies including a photo of a shirtless, disturbed-looking Syd Barrett from The Madcap Laughs cover photo session, while others replace it with a photo of a smiling Barrett sitting by a car.

The album was the band's next US release after The Dark Side of the Moon, and introduced new fans to the earlier psychedelic sound of the Syd Barrett period of Pink Floyd, which contrasted greatly to the style of their more recent work. Following the worldwide re-issue of the original two albums on CD, including the original UK version of The Piper at the Gates of Dawn, A Nice Pair is now out of print.

Track listing
All songs by Syd Barrett, except where noted.

The Piper at the Gates of Dawn
Side 1

Side 2

A Saucerful of Secrets
Side 1

Side 2

Cassette versions in the UK feature Piper on side one and Saucerful on side two.  For the US versions, "Bike" was moved to the beginning of side two, due to the longer running length of "Astronomy Domine" on this version.

United States release

The US 8-track version alters the running order more radically.
Program 1
"Astronomy Domine"
"Lucifer Sam"
"Matilda Mother"
"Flaming"
"Pow R. Toc H."
Program 2
"Interstellar Overdrive"
"The Gnome"
"Chapter 24"
"The Scarecrow"
"Bike"
Program 3
"Take Up Thy Stethoscope and Walk"
"Let There Be More Light"
"Set the Controls for the Heart of the Sun"
"Corporal Clegg"
"Jugband Blues"
Program 4
"A Saucerful of Secrets"
"See Saw"
"Remember a Day"

Personnel
Pink Floyd
Syd Barrett – guitars, lead vocals on British version of "Astronomy Domine", "Lucifer Sam", "Matilda Mother", "Flaming", "Pow R. Toc H.", "The Gnome", "Chapter 24", "The Scarecrow", "Bike", and "Jugband Blues"
David Gilmour – guitars, kazoo, vocals, lead vocals on American version of "Astronomy Domine", "Let There Be More Light", and "Corporal Clegg"
Nick Mason – drums, percussion, kazoo, vocals, lead vocals on "Corporal Clegg"
Roger Waters – bass guitar, percussion, vocals, lead vocals on "Pow R. Toc H.", "Take Up Thy Stethoscope and Walk", "Let There Be More Light", and "Set the Controls for the Heart of the Sun"
Richard Wright – Farfisa and Hammond organs, piano, tack piano, electric piano, Mellotron, harmonium, cello, vibraphone, celesta, xylophone, violin, tin whistle, vocals, lead vocals on British and American versions of "Astronomy Domine", "Matilda Mother", "Remember a Day", "See-Saw", "Let There Be More Light", and "Corporal Clegg"

Additional personnel
Peter Jenner – intro vocalisations on British and American version of "Astronomy Domine"
Norman Smith – drums and backing vocals on "Remember a Day" and drum roll on "Interstellar Overdrive", producer
The Salvation Army (The International Staff Band) on "Jugband Blues"

Cover design
 Sleeve design by Hipgnosis
 Graphics by Richard Evans
 Illustrations by Colin Elgie, Bob Lawrie

Charts and certifications

Charts

Certifications

References

Albums produced by Norman Smith (record producer)
Albums with cover art by Hipgnosis
Albums with cover art by Storm Thorgerson
Pink Floyd compilation albums
1974 compilation albums
Capitol Records compilation albums
Harvest Records compilation albums
EMI Records compilation albums